The 1950 Rhode Island gubernatorial election was held on November 7, 1950. Democratic nominee Dennis J. Roberts defeated Republican nominee Eugene J. Lachapelle with 59.34% of the vote.

General election

Candidates
Dennis J. Roberts, Democratic 
Eugene J. Lachapelle, Republican

Results

References

1950
Rhode Island
Gubernatorial